O Jin-hyok (born 28 February 1990) is a North Korean former footballer. He represented North Korea on at least two occasions in 2015.

Career statistics

International

References

1990 births
Living people
Sportspeople from Pyongyang
North Korean footballers
North Korea youth international footballers
North Korea international footballers
Association football midfielders
Rimyongsu Sports Club players